Orlando Sérgio (born 1960), is an Angolan actor. He is best known for the roles in the films Letters from War, Liberdade and The Hero.

Filmography

References

External links
 

Living people
Angolan male actors
Angolan film people
1960 births